The 1930 Oregon gubernatorial election took place on November 4, 1930 to elect the governor of the U.S. state of Oregon. The Oregon Republican Party, at the time dominant in Oregon politics, initially nominated George W. Joseph, but the nominee died prior to the general election. Joseph's former law partner Julius Meier entered the race as an independent, and defeated replacement Republican nominee Phil Metschan, Jr., Democrat Edward F. Bailey, and Socialist Albert Streiff to become the first and only independent politician to be elected Governor of Oregon.

Background and campaign
George W. Joseph won the Republican nomination, but died shortly after. The Republican Party selected Phil Metschan, Jr., son of former Oregon State Treasurer Phil Metschan, as a replacement nominee. Unlike Joseph, Metschan opposed public development of hydroelectric power along the Columbia River. The Democrats selected State Senator Edward F. Bailey of Lane County.

With a key platform of Joseph's campaign now directly opposed by the replacement nominee, Julius Meier, Joseph's former law partner, friend, and general manager of the Meier and Frank department store, agreed to enter the race as an independent candidate with Joseph's platform. Although opposed by the state's largest newspaper, The Oregonian, Meier won a resounding victory over Metschan and Bailey. Meier's victory was viewed as indicating strong public support for public hydropower development.

Election results

References

Gubernatorial
1930
Oregon
November 1930 events